Anthene pyroptera is a butterfly in the family Lycaenidae. It is found in Cameroon, Gabon, the Republic of the Congo and the Democratic Republic of the Congo (Lulua).

References

Butterflies described in 1895
Anthene
Butterflies of Africa